David Maurice Curry (born 13 June 1944) is a British Conservative Party politician. He was the Member of Parliament (MP) for Skipton and Ripon from 1987 to 2010.

Early life
Curry, the son of teachers, was educated at the Ripon Grammar School where he was head boy in 1962, and then at Corpus Christi College, Oxford where he received a bachelor's degree in modern history in 1966. He also attended the Harvard Kennedy School at Harvard University as a Kennedy Scholar. He began his career as a reporter on the Newcastle Journal in 1966. In 1970, he became the world trade editor at the Financial Times where he remained until he was elected to the European Parliament. In 1977, he founded the Paris Conservative Association.

Political career
Curry contested the safe Labour seat of Morpeth at the February 1974 general election, but was beaten by the sitting Labour MP George Grant by 13,034 votes. The two met again at the October 1974 general election, when Grant won by 14,687 votes.

Curry was elected a Member of the European Parliament in 1979 for Essex North East.  He served until 1989.

Curry was elected to the House of Commons for the safe Conservative seat of Skipton and Ripon at the 1987 general election on the retirement of the sitting Conservative MP John Watson.  Curry won the seat with a majority of 17,174 and held the seat safely until he retired from Parliament in 2010.

Following his election Curry became a member of the Agriculture Select committee until he was promoted to the government of Margaret Thatcher in 1989 as Parliamentary Under Secretary of State at the Ministry of Agriculture, Fisheries and Food.  He was promoted within the same department to Minister of State after the 1992 general election by John Major.  A year later he moved sideways to the Department for the Environment where he remained until the Major government fell at the 1997 general election. He became a Member of the Privy Council in 1996.

In opposition Curry became the Shadow Agriculture Secretary, but resigned from the Shadow Cabinet in December 1997 in protest at the policy of ruling out Britain joining the single European currency for the next ten years. In 1998, he became the chairman of the Agriculture Select Committee and, after the 2001 general election, its successor the Environment, Food and Rural Affairs Select Committee until 2003 when he promoted again to the Shadow Cabinet by Michael Howard as Shadow Local and Devolved Government Secretary.  He resigned again in 2004, this time citing 'family reasons' and was replaced by Caroline Spelman. He was a member of the Public Accounts Select Committee from 2004.

On 5 February 2009, Curry announced that he would not stand at the 2010 election.

On 19 November 2009, Curry stood down from his position as chairman of the Parliamentary Committee on Standards and Privileges after claims by The Daily Telegraph regarding his expenses and reportedly referred himself to the Independent Parliamentary Standards Authority for investigation.

In January 2013, Curry was appointed editor-in-chief of The Parliamentary Review.

Publications
The Food War: US-EU Food Politics by David Curry, 1982, EDG
The Conservative Tradition in Europe Edited by David Curry, 1998, Mainstream
Lobbying Government: A practical Guide for the Housing Industry and Lobby by David Curry, 1999, Chartered Institute of Housing, 
The Sorcerers Apprentice: Government and Globalisation by David Curry, 2000, Local Government Association,

References

External links
 ePolitix.com - David Curry MP
 Guardian Unlimited Politics - Ask Aristotle: David Curry MP
 TheyWorkForYou.com - David Curry MP
 The Public Whip - David Curry MP voting record
 BBC News - David Curry MP  profile 30 March 2006
 

|-

|-

1944 births
Living people
Alumni of Corpus Christi College, Oxford
Conservative Party (UK) MEPs
English male journalists
Harvard Kennedy School alumni
Members of the Parliament of the United Kingdom for English constituencies
Members of the Privy Council of the United Kingdom
MEPs for England 1979–1984
MEPs for England 1984–1989
People educated at Ripon Grammar School
People from Burton upon Trent
UK MPs 1987–1992
UK MPs 1992–1997
UK MPs 1997–2001
UK MPs 2001–2005
UK MPs 2005–2010
Conservative Party (UK) MPs for English constituencies
Kennedy Scholarships